The Belgian is a 1917 American silent film directed by Sidney Olcott and produced by Sidney Olcott Players with Valentine Grant and Walker Whiteside in the leading roles. It is not known whether the film currently survives.

Plot
As described in a film magazine, two simple Belgian folk, Jeanne (Grant) and Victor (Whiteside), love each other. Victor is a gifted sculptor and is taken to Paris for training. There he meets Countess de Vries (Crute) and becomes infatuated. She is a German spy and meets many military men through him. Berger (Randolf), the postmaster in Belgium who is also a German spy, wants Jeanne for his wife. She resists him and goes to the church for protection. The machinations of the German secret service include every possible torment for those oppressed by their power, and when war is declared Jeanne would have suffered greatly had not Berger been killed when Victor was wounded. Jeanne nurses Victor back to health and over his heartbreak for the countess. True love returns, and together they work for Belgium and watch for the troops of a larger but not greater nation to come to their aid.

Cast
Walker Whiteside as Victor Morenne
Valentine Grant as Jeanne Desfree
Arda La Croix as Father Julian
Sally Crute as Countess de Vries
Georgio Majeroni as Colonel Dupin
Anders Randolf as Berger
Henry Leone as Jeanne's Uncle
Blanche Davenport as Victor's Mother

References

External links

 The Belgian website dedicated to Sidney Olcott

 lantern slide(Wayback Machine)

1918 films
American silent feature films
American black-and-white films
1910s American films